The 1923 Purdue Boilermakers football team was an American football team that represented Purdue University during the 1923 Big Ten Conference football season. In their second season under head coach James Phelan, the Boilermakers compiled a 2–5–1 record, finished in a tie for seventh place in the Big Ten Conference with a 1–4 record against conference opponents, and were outscored by their opponents by a total of 106 to 65. Ralph Claypool was the team captain.

Schedule

References

Purdue
Purdue Boilermakers football seasons
Purdue Boilermakers football